The Golden Valley Four-Ball was a golf tournament played at Golden Valley Country Club in Golden Valley, Minnesota in 1943 and 1944. The 1943 event was a round-robin with 8 pairs played from September 3 to 6. One match was played on the first day and two on the other three days. Positions were determined by the net number of holes up or down over the seven rounds. The 1944 event followed a similar format and was played from July 6 to 9.

Winners

References

Former PGA Tour events
Golf in Minnesota